was the 116th Emperor of Japan, according to the traditional order of succession. Momozono's reign spanned the years from 1747 until his death in 1762. Momozono's reign was mostly quiet, with only one incident occurring that involved a small number of Kuge who advocated for the restoration of direct Imperial rule. These Kuge were punished by the shōgun, who held de facto power in the country. Momozono fathered two sons with his one and only lady in waiting, but he died at a young age in 1762. The line of succession fell to Momozono's sister, Princess Toshiko, who became Empress Go-Sakuramachi. Due to the young age of Momozono's sons, she also became empress regent to the future Emperor Go-Momozono until he became of age to rule.

Events of Momozono's life

Early life
Toohito was the firstborn son of Emperor Sakuramachi, while his mother was a concubine named Sadako (定子) (Empress Dowager Kaimei, 開明門院). His Imperial family lived with him in the Dairi of the Heian Palace. Toohito's pre-accession title was initially Yaho-no-miya (八穂宮) and later Sachi-no-miya (茶地宮). While Prince Toohito was invested as Crown Prince on 25 April 1747 it is unknown what other events took place in his early life other than the information provided here.

Reign
Prince Toohito acceded to the throne on 9 June 1747 as Emperor when his father abdicated in his favor. The era name was then changed from Enkyō to Kan'en (meaning "Prolonging Lenience") to mark the occasion. Momozono fathered at least two sons with a court lady named Ichijō Tomiko during his reign. While he held the political title of Emperor, it was in name only as the shōguns of the Tokugawa family controlled Japan. During the first year or so of Momozono's reign the first performance of the popular eleven-act puppet play Kanadehon Chūshingura was performed. The fictionalized story of the play is about samurai revenge, and the 1702 vendetta of the 47 rōnin. Also of note was a Ryukyuan diplomatic mission from Shō Kei of the Ryūkyū Kingdom which was received by the shogunate. On 7 October 1749 a powerful storm struck Kyoto, and the keep of Nijō Castle burned after it was struck by lightning. The era name was changed to Hōreki in 1751 to mark the death of the retired Emperor Sakuramachi, and the death of the former shōgun Tokugawa Yoshimune. In the year that followed a second Ryukyuan diplomatic mission from Shō Boku of the Ryūkyū Kingdom arrived in Edo. Momozono had no role in these missions as they were expected to pay tribute to the shogunate.

The 1754 Hōreki River incident caused the deaths of eighty-eight people due to a harsh project ordered by the shōgun, but again the Emperor was not involved. Another incident though occurred in 1758, when a small number of Kuge were punished by the shogunate for advocating the restoration of direct Imperial rule. Two years later Shōgun Ieshige resigned, and his son became the 10th shōgun of the Tokugawa shogunate. In 1762, Emperor Momozono abdicated the throne in favor of his sister Imperial Princess Toshiko, who became Empress Go-Sakuramachi. His retirement did not last long as he died that same year on 31 August 1762 at the age of 21. Momozono's kami is enshrined in an Imperial mausoleum (misasagi), Tsuki no wa no misasagi, at Sennyū-ji in Higashiyama-ku, Kyoto.  Also enshrined here are Momozono's  immediate Imperial predecessors since Emperor Go-Mizunoo – Meishō, Go-Kōmyō, Go-Sai, Reigen, Higashiyama, Nakamikado and Sakuramachi, along with five of his immediate Imperial successors – Go-Sakuramachi, Go-Momozono, Kōkaku, Ninkō, and Kōmei.

Eras and Kugyō
The years of Momozono's reign are more specifically identified by more than one era name or nengō. While  is a collective term for the very few most powerful men attached to the court of the Emperor of Japan in pre-Meiji eras. Even during those years in which the court's actual influence outside the palace walls was minimal, the hierarchic organization persisted. In general, this elite group included only three to four men at a time.  These were hereditary courtiers whose experience and background would have brought them to the pinnacle of a life's career.

The following eras occurred during Momozono's reign:

 Enkyō    (1744–1748)
 Kan'en   (1748–1751)
 Hōreki  (1751–1764)

During Momozono's reign, this apex of the Daijō-kan included:
 Kampaku, Konoe Uchisaki.
 Sadaijin
 Udaijin
 Naidaijin
 Dainagon

Genealogy
Emperor Momozono had only one lady-in-waiting named Ichijō Tomiko, and fathered at least two sons with her.

Ancestry

See also
 Emperor of Japan
 List of Emperors of Japan
 Imperial cult

Notes

References
 Meyer, Eva-Maria. (1999).  Japans Kaiserhof in der Edo-Zeit: unter besonderer Berücksichtigung der Jahre 1846 bis 1867.  Münster: LIT Verlag. 	;   OCLC 42041594
 Ponsonby-Fane, Richard Arthur Brabazon. (1959). The Imperial House of Japan. Kyoto: Ponsonby Memorial Society. OCLC 194887
 Screech, Timon. (2006). Secret Memoirs of the Shoguns: Isaac Titsingh and Japan, 1779–1822. London: RoutledgeCurzon. ; OCLC 65177072
 Titsingh, Isaac. (1834). Nihon Ōdai Ichiran; ou,  Annales des empereurs du Japon.  Paris: Royal Asiatic Society, Oriental Translation Fund of Great Britain and Ireland.  OCLC 5850691

Japanese emperors
1741 births
1762 deaths
Emperor Momozono
Emperor Momozono
Emperor Momozono
Emperor Momozono
18th-century Japanese monarchs